Laura Helene Prepon (born March 7, 1980) is an American actress. She rose to fame with her role as Donna Pinciotti in the Fox sitcom That '70s Show (1998–2006). She is also known for portraying Alex Vause in the Netflix comedy-drama series Orange Is the New Black (2013–2019). Prepon made her film debut in 2001 with the independent drama Southlander. Her other films include the romantic drama Come Early Morning (2006), the comedy Lay the Favorite (2012), the thriller The Girl on the Train (2016), and the drama The Hero (2017).

Early life
Prepon was born in Watchung, New Jersey. She is the youngest of five children of Marjorie (née Coll), a high school teacher and gourmet home chef, and Michael Prepon, an orthopedic surgeon. Prepon's father died during heart surgery in 1993 at age 49; she was 13 at the time. She attended Watchung Hills Regional High School until she was 15, then studied at the Total Theatre Lab in New York City. Her father was Jewish, of Russian Jewish descent, and her mother has mostly Irish Catholic ancestry. Her maternal great-great-great-grandfather was Union Army General Joseph Bradford Carr.

Career

1995–2005
Prepon appeared in plays such as A Woman of Property and Ascension Day while in New York. In 1996, she studied drama with acting teacher Caroline Thomas at Thomas' Total Theatre Lab. Later, in September 1997, she premiered on a Levi Strauss-developed show called They Go On, an Internet-based soap opera. Prepon had also worked as a model and has done photo shoots in Paris, Milan, and Brazil.

Prepon starred as Donna Pinciotti on the Fox sitcom That '70s Show from 1998 to 2006. Donna became the girlfriend and next-door neighbor of Eric Forman (Topher Grace). Randy Pearson (Josh Meyers), who was introduced in the eighth and final season of the series, became Donna's third love interest after Grace left the series. Prepon attended film school while she worked on That '70s Show.

Prepon co-starred in the college comedy Slackers (2002), about three best friends who are blackmailed for cheating their way through college. She was nominated for a Teen Choice Award in 2002 for her role in That '70s Show. In 2001, she made her film debut in Steve Hanft's musical comedy-drama Southlander with Beck, Beth Orton and Hank Williams III, where she played Seven=Five, a young TV telepathic. In 2004, Prepon worked on the independent drama film The Pornographer: A Love Story. The film tells the story of an obsessive relationship between a director and an actress.

Prepon was named one of Stuff magazine's "102 Sexiest Women In The World" in 2002 and one of Maxim magazine's "Hot 100" in 2005. Prepon had a cameo voice appearance as a United Nations Space Command marine in Halo 2, which was released in 2004. Her first notable film role came in 2004 with the dark drama Lightning Bug with Bret Harrison, Kevin Gage and Ashley Laurence. Branching into other arenas than acting, Prepon also served as executive producer of the film. She also appeared on an episode of MTV's Cribs in 2003.

2005–2010

In 2006, Prepon co-starred with Misha Collins in the psychological thriller Karla, based on the true story of Paul Bernardo and his wife Karla Homolka, a Canadian couple who kidnapped, sexually abused, and murdered three girls, marking a contrast to her usual lighthearted roles. She was also an executive producer of E! Hollywood Hold'em the same year. Prepon co-starred with Bryan Greenberg as Hannah Daniels in the ABC drama October Road, which debuted March 15, 2007. The show was canceled by ABC on May 12, 2008, despite strong ratings and a grassroots campaign from the show's fanbase to keep the show alive. In April 2007, she starred in a dramatic short film Once Upon a Time. She also appeared in the 2005 Oxygen romantic comedy Romancing the Bride. She also was the original voice for Hayley Smith on the Fox animated sitcom American Dad! and voiced her in an unaired pilot. She appeared as Lauren, the long-lost sister of Mary Shannon (Mary McCormack) in the USA Network mystery drama In Plain Sight in the episode "A Frond in Need". On February 5, 2010, it was announced that Prepon signed on to star in Awkward Situations for Men, a pilot on ABC. In 2009, Prepon appeared in the CBS sitcom How I Met Your Mother as Karen, one of the girlfriends of Ted Mosby (Josh Radnor), in the episode "Sorry, Bro". She reprised her role in the episodes "The Front Porch" in 2009 and "Say Cheese" in 2010. She also appeared in the Fox medical drama House M.D. in the episode "Private Lives".

Prepon had been taking directing classes at the Art Center College of Design. She directed a short film, Abide with Me, about a 10-year-old boy who, "upon bearing witness to his father's murder, is rendered mute". Prepon stated she plans on making Abide with Me into a feature film.

2011–present
In early 2011, Prepon guest-starred in an episode of the ABC police procedural drama Castle as an actress studying for the role of Nikki Heat, a character created by Nathan Fillion's title character. Prepon had been working on a web series, which she directed and edited, starring her then-boyfriend Scott Michael Foster. They had sold the series to Comedy Central. In February 2011, she was cast as the title character Chelsea Newman on the NBC sitcom Are You There, Chelsea?, based on Chelsea Handler's 2008 book Are You There, Vodka? It's Me, Chelsea. NBC premiered the show on January 11, 2012, and cancelled it on May 11, 2012. She guest-starred in the TBS sitcom Men at Work. In mid-2012, Prepon signed on to co-star with Taylor Schilling in the Netflix original comedy-drama series Orange Is the New Black, based on Piper Kerman's 2010 memoir Orange Is the New Black: My Year in a Women's Prison. She was cast as Alex Vause, a former drug importer and girlfriend of Piper Chapman (Schilling). The series premiered on July 11, 2013. Prepon was a regular in the first season, but appeared in only four of the 13 episodes in the second season. She returned as a series regular in the third season.

In 2016, Prepon and nutritionist Elizabeth Troy co-wrote The Stash Plan, a wellness book that draws on Prepon's experiences eating organic foods since she was a child, and her struggles with weight, low energy, and digestive issues. The book debuted at #10 under "Advice, How-To & Miscellaneous" on The New York Times Best Seller list. Since publishing The Stash Plan, Prepon has expanded her cooking career, launching a line of kitchenware products called PrepOn Kitchen and regularly posting instructional videos online.

In 2016, Prepon appeared in the psychological thriller The Girl on the Train, based on Paula Hawkins' novel of the same name. In 2017, she played Charlotte opposite Sam Elliott in The Hero. Prepon directed the tenth episode of Orange Is the New Blacks fifth season, titled "The Reverse Midas Touch". On April 30, 2022, it was announced that Prepon would have a guest appearance in the follow-up sitcom, That '90s Show. That 90's Show debuted January 19, 2023 on Netflix.

Personal life
Prepon was in a relationship with her That '70s Show co-star's brother Christopher Masterson from 1999 to 2007. She later dated Scott Michael Foster for several years, but said in 2013 they had broken up.

In August 2017, Prepon gave birth to her and fiancé actor Ben Foster's daughter. Prepon and Foster married in June 2018. Their second child, a son, was born in February 2020.

Prepon became a Scientologist in 1999. In 2021, she revealed that she had not practiced Scientology since 2016 and it was no longer a part of her life.

Filmography

Film

Television

Awards and nominations

References

External links

 
 
 

1980 births
Living people
20th-century American actresses
21st-century American actresses
Actresses from New Jersey
Jewish American actresses
American film actresses
American television actresses
American people of Irish descent
American people of Russian-Jewish descent
American former Scientologists
People from Watchung, New Jersey
Watchung Hills Regional High School alumni